Prince Alexander of Battenberg may refer to:

Alexander, Prince of Bulgaria, Prince Alexander Joseph of Battenberg, (1857–1893), first prince of modern Bulgaria
Alexander Mountbatten, 1st Marquess of Carisbrooke, Prince Alexander of Battenberg, (1886–1960)